Exodus Valley is a steep moraine-filled valley which descends northward from Midnight Plateau between Colosseum Ridge and Exodus Glacier, in the Darwin Mountains of Antarctica. It was so named by the Victoria University of Wellington Antarctic Expedition (1962–63) because the valley is virtually the only easy route of descent from Midnight Plateau.

References 

Valleys of Oates Land